Korean Singaporean or Singaporean Korean may refer to:
Koreans in Singapore
Singaporeans in North Korea
Singaporeans in South Korea
North Korea–Singapore relations
South Korea–Singapore relations
Multiracial people of Korean and Singaporean descent